Ellan Vannin was the name of a number of ships:

 , a packet steamer built by John Laird, Birkenhead in 1854 for service with the Castletown Steam Navigation Company.
 , originally constructed as an iron paddle steamer in 1860 and named Mona's Isle. Name changed to Ellan Vannin following a re-build in 1883. Foundered between the Bar Light Ship and the Q1 Buoy in the River Mersey, December 3, 1909.

Ship names